The line S7 is a commuter rail route forming part of the Milan suburban railway service, which converges on the city of Milan, Italy.

The route runs over the infrastructure of the Milan–Monza and the Monza–Molteno railways, and the section from Molteno to Lecco, opened on 20 November 1888, of the Como–Lecco railway. In the section from Molteno to Lecco it is also present another regional service train connecting Como and Lecco. Like all the other Milan suburban railway service routes, it is operated by Trenord.

Route 
  Milano Porta Garibaldi ↔ Molteno ↔ Lecco

Line S7, a radial route, heads initially in an northeasterly direction from Milan to Monza. From there, after Villasanta it turns north-west - away from the main railway to Lecco/Bergamo - and then, after Carate, turns north-east to Lecco. The travel takes 1h39'.

History 
The route was activated on 14 December 2014, substituting the former R19 regional service. It is the sole line of the suburban service which runs on a section with a single track without electrification, so it is the sole line with a single ride per hour.

Stations 
The stations on the S7 are as follows (stations with a coloured background are within the municipality of Milan):

See also 

 History of rail transport in Italy
 List of Milan suburban railway stations
 Rail transport in Italy
 Transport in Milan

References

External links
 ATM – official site 
 Trenord – official site 
 Schematic of Line S7 – schematic depicting all stations on Line S7

Milan S Lines
2014 establishments in Italy
Railway lines opened in 2014